The Kangpokpi district of Manipur state in India has 9 subdivisions. It was created in 2016: at the time of the 2011 Census of India, it was a part of the Senapati district.

Blocks 

The Kangpokpi district has 9 subdivisions or Tribal Development (T.D.) blocks:

 Kangpokpi
 Saikul
 Saitu Gamphazol
 Tujang Waichong
 Champhai
 Kangchup Geljang
 Bungte Chiru
 Island
 Lhungtin

At the time of the 2011 census of India, the area of the district was part of three subdivisions of the Senapati district.

Towns 

The district has one town:

Villages 

Following is a list of the villages as per the 2011 census:

Sadar Hills West block 

The Sadar Hills West block is now sub-divided into Kangpokpi, Saitu Gamphazol, Tujang Waichong, and Champhai blocks.

Saitu-Gamphazol block 

The Saitu-Gamphazol block is now sub-divided into Kangchup Geljang and Bungte Chiru blocks.

Sadar Hills East block 

The Sadar Hills East block is now sub-divided into Island, Lhungtin, and Saikul blocks.

References 

Kangpokpi